The office of attorney general of Louisiana has existed since the colonial period. Under Article IV, Section 8 of the Constitution of Louisiana, the attorney general is elected statewide for a four-year term and is the chief legal officer of the state.  Additionally, "the attorney general shall have authority (1) to institute, prosecute, or intervene in any civil action or proceeding; (2) upon the written request of a district attorney, to advise and assist in the prosecution of any criminal case; and (3) for cause, when authorized by the court which would have original jurisdiction and subject to judicial review, (a) to institute, prosecute, or intervene in any criminal action or proceeding, or (b) to supersede any attorney representing the state in any civil or criminal action.

The attorney general shall exercise other powers and perform other duties authorized by this constitution or by law."

The current attorney general, Jeff Landry has been in office since 2016.

Territory of Orleans (1804–1812)

John Mahlon Dickens 1804–1807
James Brown 1807–1809
Francois Xavier Martin 1809–1810
Louis Moreau-Lislet 1810–1812

State of Louisiana (1812–present)

Notes and sources

External links
 Louisiana Attorney General official website

Attorneysgeneral
Attorneysgeneral